Nikita Kamalov (born August 8, 1995) is a Russian ice hockey defenceman. He is currently playing with SKA Saint Petersburg of the Kontinental Hockey League (KHL).

Kamalov made his Kontinental Hockey League debut playing with Metallurg Novokuznetsk during the 2013–14 KHL season.

References

External links

1995 births
Living people
Amur Khabarovsk players
Metallurg Novokuznetsk players
Russian ice hockey defencemen
SKA Saint Petersburg players
HC Sochi players
Competitors at the 2019 Winter Universiade
Universiade medalists in ice hockey
Universiade gold medalists for Russia
People from Novokuznetsk
Sportspeople from Kemerovo Oblast